is a Japanese football player for FC Tiamo Hirakata.

Club statistics
Updated to 23 February 2018.

References

External links

Profile at Giravanz Kitakyushu

1992 births
Living people
National Institute of Fitness and Sports in Kanoya alumni
Association football people from Kagoshima Prefecture
Japanese footballers
J2 League players
J3 League players
Giravanz Kitakyushu players
FC Tiamo Hirakata players
Association football midfielders